The following is a list of prominent individuals who are or were Croatian citizens or of Croatian ancestry.

Art

Architecture

 Viktor Axmann – architect, Jewish
 Nikola Bašić – architect
 Vjekoslav Bastl – architect
 Julio Deutsch – architect, art nouveau style,
 Hugo Ehrlich – architect, Jewish
 Ignjat Fischer – architect, Jewish
 Stjepan Gomboš – architect, Jewish
 Vjekoslav Heinzel
 Leo Hönigsberg – architect, Jewish
 Lavoslav Horvat
 Drago Ibler
 Viktor Kovačić – architect
 Slavko Löwy – architect, Jewish
 Rudolf Lubinski – architect, Jewish
 Paskoje Miličević Mihov – architect
 Vlado Milunić – architect
 Juraj Neidhardt – architect
 Velimir Neidhardt – architect
 Stjepan Planić – architect
 Vjenceslav Richter – architect
 Vladimir Šterk – architect, Jewish
 Anđeo Lovrov Zadranin – architect

Sculpture 

 Antun Augustinčić
 Lujo Bezeredi 
 Andrija Buvina
 Ante Dabro
 Juraj Dalmatinac
 Branislav Dešković
 Ivan Duknović
 Dušan Džamonja
 Robert Frangeš-Mihanović
 Ivo Kerdić
 Albert Kinert
 Ivan Kožarić
 Frano Kršinić
 Vasko Lipovac
 Ivan Meštrović
 Oscar Nemon
 Dimitrije Popović 
 Kosta Angeli Radovani
 Vanja Radauš
 Master Radovan
 Ivan Rendić
 Toma Rosandić
 Branko Ružić
 Ivan Sabolić
 Petar Smajić
 Aleksandar Srnec
 Marija Ujević-Galetović
 Maksimilijan Vanka
 Franjo Vranjanin

Painting 

 Oskar Alexander
 Lovro Artuković
 Vladimir Becić
 Federiko Benković
 Lujo Bezeredi
 Charles Billich
 Nikola Božidarević
 Vlaho Bukovac
 Eugen Buktenica
 Bela Čikoš Sesija – painter, representative of symbolism: art-deco and art nouveau
 Menci Clement Crnčić
 Josip Crnobori
 Lovro Dobričević
 Jelena Dorotka
 Davor Džalto
 Marta Ehrlich
 Emerik Feješ
 Eva Fischer
 Alen Floričić
 Dragan Gaži
 Vilko Gecan
 Ivan Generalić – naïve art
 Josip Generalić
 Oton Gliha
 Petar Grgec
 Krsto Hegedušić
 Oskar Herman
 Josip Horvat Međimurec
 Mirko Ilić – cartoonist, graphic designer
 Nina Ivančić
 Oton Iveković
 Marijan Jevšovar
 Ignjat Job
 Drago Jurak
 Gabrijel Jurkić
 Vjekoslav Karas
 John of Kastav
 Albert Kinert
 Željko Kipke
 Mira Klobučar
 Juraj Julije Klović – portrait miniatures
 Tripo Kokolja
 Edo Kovačević
 Mijo Kovačić
 Ladislav Kralj
 Miroslav Kraljević
 Živa Kraus
 Kristian Kreković
 Vlado Kristl
 Tomislav Krizman
 Izidor Kršnjavi
 Ferdinand Kulmer
 Ivan Lacković Croata – naïve art
 Loren Ligorio
 Vasko Lipovac
 Zvonimir Lončarić
 Dora Maar – photographer, painter, model
 Andrija Maurović – illustrator
 Mato Celestin Medović
 Martin Mehkek
 Ivan Milat-Luketa
 Jerolim Miše
 Antun Motika
 Franjo Mraz
 Edo Murtić
 Virgilije Nevjestić
 Vera Nikolić Podrinska
 Alfred Pal
 Ordan Petlevski
 Ivan Picelj
 Dimitrije Popović
 Oton Postružnik
 Ivan Rabuzin – naïve art
 Josip Račić
 Mirko Rački
 Božidar Rašica
 Slava Raškaj
 Ivan Rein
 Đuro Seder
 Zlatko Sirotić
 Matija Skurjeni
 Petar Smajić
 Aleksandar Srnec
 Miljenko Stančić
 Slavko Stolnik
 Zlatko Šulentić
 Miroslav Šutej
 Marino Tartaglia
 Đuro Tiljak
 Ivan Tišov
 Lavoslav Torti
 Marijan Trepše
 Ana Tzarev – naïve art
 Milivoj Uzelac – painter
 Maksimilijan Vanka
 Vladimir Varlaj
 Ivan Večenaj
 Matko Vekić
 Mladen Veža – illustrator
 Emanuel Vidović
 Mirko Virius – naïve art
 Adolf Waldinger
 Viktor Đerek – photographer

Film and theatre 

 Ante Babaja
 Steve Bacic
 Eric Bana – (born Eric Banadinović) Hollywood actor
 Relja Bašić – actor
 Branko Bauer
 George Beban – actor, director, writer and producer
 Ena Begović
 Mia Begović 
 Rene Bitorajac
 Mirjana Bohanec
 Slavko Brankov
 Vinko Brešan – director
 Veljko Bulajić – ethnic Montenegrin film director
 Zlatko Burić – actor
 Boris Buzančić – actor
 Nathaniel Buzolic – actor
 Al Christy – actor
 Petra Cicvarić
 Zlatko Crnković – actor
 Zrinka Cvitešić
 Nataša Dorčić
 Vanja Drach
 Claire Du Brey – actress
 Vlatko Dulić – actor
 Boris Dvornik – actor
 Jenna Elfman – television and movie actress
 Stipe Erceg – actor
 Nela Eržišnik – actress, comedian
 Judah Friedlander – actor and comedian
 Mira Furlan – actress (Babylon 5, Lost)
 Stanka Gjurić – actress, writer, filmmaker
 Gallagher – comedian and prop comic
 Emil Glad
 Ratko Glavina
 Obrad Gluščević
 Ljupka Gojić – model
 Krešo Golik
 Frank Gorshin – actor and comedian
 Ivo Gregurević
 Gloria Grey – screen, stage actress and director
 Goran Grgić
 Rajko Grlić
 Fedor Hanžeković
 Ivan Herceg – actor
 Werner Herzog – film director, producer, screenwriter, actor, opera director
 Alaina Huffman
 Željko Ivanek – actor
 Nives Ivanković
 Anne Jackson – actress
 Nataša Janjić
 Toni Jeričević
 Anthony Jeselnik – comedian
 Mladen Juran
 Sena Jurinac
 Jagoda Kaloper
 Saby Kamalich
 Sonja Kastl
 Ljubomir Kerekeš
 Michael Klesic – actor
 Matija Kluković
 Sylva Koscina – actress, model
 Mario Kovač – theatre and film director
 Robert Kurbaša
 Frano Lasić
 John G. Lenic
 Rachel Leskovac – actress
 Edvin Liverić
 Leon Lučev
 Branko Lustig – film producer (winner of two Oscar awards)
 Franjo Majetić
 John Malkovich
 Dalibor Matanić
 Nevio Marasović
 Branko Marjanović
 Ante Čedo Martinić
 Stojan Matavulj
 Mark Matkevich – actor
 Rene Medvešek
 Sven Medvešek
 Oktavijan Miletić
 Ivana Miličević – actress
 Vatroslav Mimica
 Ildy Modrovich – television producer, writer and singer
 Nina Morić – model
 Patrick Muldoon – actor
 Lorenzo Music – actor, voice actor, writer, television producer and musician
 Antun Nalis – actor
 Bojan Navojec
 Maja Nekić
 Antonio Nuić
 Zrinko Ogresta
 Marija Omaljev-Grbić
 Mia Oremović
 Krsto Papić – film director
 Leona Paraminski
 Frank Pavich – film director, producer
 Stjepan Perić
 Anton Perich – filmmaker, photographer and video artist
 Edo Peročević – actor, radio speaker
 Žarko Potočnjak
 Alma Prica
 Zvonimir Rogoz – actor
 Rick Rossovich – actor
 Branko Schmidt
 Lucija Šerbedžija
 Ivo Serdar
 Shaun Sipos – actor
 Marija Škaričić
 Mia Čorak Slavenska – prima ballerina
 Tonko Soljan – film and television producer
 Fabijan Šovagović – actor
 Filip Šovagović
 Gabriela Spanic – actress
 Lita Stantic – producer, screenplay writer, and director
 Nera Stipičević
 Yvonne Suhor – actress
 Ognjen Sviličić
 Nikola Tanhofer
 Vanessa Terkes – actress, TV show host in Latin America; her grandfather Cvjetko was Croatian
 Ivica Vidović
 Goran Višnjić – actor (ER)
 Zlatko Vitez
 Antun Vrdoljak – film director
 Severina Vučković – entertainer, actress
 Dianne Wiest – American actress
 Anthony Yerkovich – television producer and writer
 Matthew Yuricich - special effects artist
 Richard Yuricich – special visual effects artist
 Lordan Zafranović
 Louis Zorich – American actor
 Jim Zulevic – actor, comedian, TV writer, and radio host

Media 

 Lidia Bastianich – American celebrity chef, television host, author, and restaurateur
 Adrian Chiles – British television and radio presenter
 Slavica Ecclestone – British-Croatian former model
 Robert Herjavec – Canadian businessman, investor, author, dancer, and television personality from Shark Tank
 Bill Kurtis – journalist, television reporter, producer
 Katie Pavlich – American conservative commentator, author, blogger, podcaster
 Goran Milić – worked in HRT, now works in Al Jazeera
 Tony Robbins – American life coach, self-help author and motivational speaker
 Teresa Scanlan – Miss America 2011
 Petra Stunt – British designer
 Vladimir Herzog – Croatian born Brazilian journalist

Academics

History 
 James Belich – historian
 Julije Kempf – historian, writer
 Nada Klaić – historian
 Vjekoslav Klaić – historian
 Ivan Kukuljević Sakcinski – historian
 Ivan Lučić – historian
 Dominik Mandić – historian
 Franjo Rački – historian
 Ivan Ratkaj – historian, Jesuit, explorer
 Juraj Ratkaj – historian
 Ferdo Šišić – historian
 Ludovicus Tubero – historian

Invention 

 Zlata Bartl – inventor of Vegeta
 Josip Belušić – inventor
 Franjo Hannaman – inventor, engineer
 Marcel Kiepach – inventor
 Mario Kovač – computer engineering professor and inventor
 Ferdinand Kovačević – inventor
 Giovanni Luppis – inventor of the torpedo 
 Slavoljub Eduard Penkala – inventor
 Mario Puratić – inventor who made major advances in fishing technology
 Ralph Sarich – inventor of the orbital engine
 David Schwarz – aviation pioneer of Jewish ancestry
 Marin Soljačić – inventor of wireless energy transfer
 Ante Šupuk – engineer
 Tomislav Uzelac – programmer, inventor of the first successful MP3 player
 Faust Vrančić – inventor of the parachute 
 Ivan Vučetić – inventor of dactyloscopy

Social science 

 Ivan Belostenec – lexicographer
 Juraj Dobrila – cleric, benefactor
 Elsie Ivancich Dunin – cultural ethnologist, author, professor, choreographer
 Ljudevit Gaj – linguist, reformer 
 Vatroslav Jagić – philologist
 Milan Kangrga – philosopher
 Bartol Kašić – lexicographer
 Juraj Križanić – social philosopher
 Franjo Kuhač – folklorist, ethnologist
 Jakov Mikalja – linguist and lexicographer
 Miroslav Radman – genetic biologist
 Stanislav Pavao Skalić – encyclopedist, adventurer
 Rudolf Steiner – philosopher
 Josip Juraj Strossmayer – cleric, benefactor
 Rudi Supek – philosopher
 Henry Suzzallo – educator
 Ante Topić-Mimara – art collector
 Vinko Žganec – folklorist, ethnomusicologist

Science 

 Gaja Alaga – physicist
 Giorgio Baglivi – physician and scientist from Ragusa
 Antun Karlo Bakotić – physicist and writer
 Mladen Bestvina – mathematician
 Ruđer Bošković – theologian, physicist, astronomer, mathematician, philosopher, diplomat, poet, Jesuit and polymath
 Branko Bošnjaković – physicist, environmentalist
 Fran Bošnjaković – engineer, physicist
 Juraj Božičević – engineer
 Frane Bulić – archaeologist
 Predrag Cvitanović – physicist
 Milislav Demerec – biologist
 Andrija Dudić – naturalist, astronomer, physician
 William Feller – mathematician
 Andrija Fuderer – chemist, chess player
 Artur Gavazzi – geographer
 Marin Getaldić – physicist, mathematician
 Vladimir Jurko Glaser – physicist
 Dragutin Gorjanović-Kramberger – geologist, paleoanthropologist and paleontologist
 Stjepan Gradić – mathematician, philosopher, physicist, writer and polymath
 Mirko Dražen Grmek – physician, science writer and historian
 Branko Horvat – economist
 Željko Ivezić – astrophysicist
 Zvonimir Janko – mathematician
 Korado Korlević – astronomer, asteroid discoverer
 Oton Kučera – mathematician, physicist
 Zvonko Kusić – physician
 Jacob Matijevic – NASA engineer
 Eduard Miloslavić – physician
 Andrija Mohorovičić – geophysicist
 Stjepan Mohorovičić – physicist
 Grga Novak – archaeologist, historian
 Franjo Petriš – philosopher, humanist, writer and polymath
 Đuro Pilar – geologist
 Stjepan Poljak – physician
 Eduard Prugovečki – physicist, writer
 Miroslav Radman – biologist
 Paško Rakić – neuroscientist
 Goran Senjanović – physicist
 Zvonimir Šeparović – lawyer, (victimology)
 Ante Šercer – physician
 Mihalj Šilobod Bolšić – Roman Catholic priest, mathematician, writer, and musical theorist who wrote the first Croatian arithmetic textbook
 Marin Soljačić – physicist
 Andrija Štampar – physician, diplomat
 Marijan Šunjić – physicist
 Ivan Supek – physicist, philosopher
 Ćiro Truhelka – archaeologist and art historian
 Vladimir Varičak – mathematician, physicist
 Mirko Vidaković – forester, botanist
 Nikola Vitov Gučetić – statesmen, philosopher, science writer
 Faust Vrančić – philosopher, thinker
 Vladimir Vranić – mathematician
 Juan Vucetich – anthropologist, police official who pioneered fingerprinting
 Vladimir Žerjavić – statistician, economist

Nobel Prize 

  Ivo Andrić – literature
  Paul L. Modrich – chemistry
  Vladimir Prelog – chemistry
  Lavoslav Ružička – chemistry

Music

Composers 

 Julije Bajamonti – composer
 Krešimir Baranović
 Blagoje Bersa – composer
 Jakov Gotovac – composer
 Josip Hatze
 Milan Horvat
 Ivo Josipović – composer, 3rd President of Croatia
 Igor Kuljerić – composer, conductor
 Fran Lhotka
 Lovro von Matačić
 Johnny Mercer – American lyricist, singer-songwriter; co-founder of Capitol Records
 Lav Mirski
 Ivan Padovec – composer
 Boris Papandopulo – conductor, composer
 Dora Pejačević – composer
 Milan Sachs
 Luka Sorkočević – composer
 Franz von Suppé – composer of light operas, born and raised in the Kingdom of Dalmatia
 Josip Štolcer-Slavenski – composer
 Stjepan Šulek – composer
 Vjekoslav Šutej
 Ivo Tijardović – composer
 Ivan Zajc – composer

Classical 

 Zlatko Baloković – violinist
 Max Emanuel Cenčić – countertenor
 Valter Dešpalj – cellist
 Sena Jurinac – opera singer
 Franjo Krežma – violinist
 Stephen Kovacevich – classical pianist
 Ivo Maček – pianist
 Lovro von Matačić – conductor
 Zinka Kunc-Milanov – soprano
 Maksim Mrvica – pianist
 Tomislav Mužek – tenor
 Ivo Pogorelić – pianist
 Ema Pukšec (Ilma De Murska) – opera singer
 Ruža Pospiš-Baldani – mezzo-soprano
 Vjekoslav Šutej – conductor
 Milka Trnina – soprano
 Dunja Vejzović – soprano
 Ana Vidović – guitarist
 Dubravka Zubović – opera singer and voice teacher

Popular 

 2Cellos – cellist duo
 Lidija Bajuk – musician
 Zvonko Bogdan – singer and performer of traditional folk songs
 Michael Bublé – singer
 Tony Butala – singer of The Lettermen
 Colonia – dance music group
 Arsen Dedić – composer and singer
 Veljko Despot – discographer
 Darko Domijan – singer
 Oliver Dragojević – singer
 Doris Dragović – singer
 Sergio Endrigo – singer
 Flyer – band
 Gibonni – singer
 Davor Gobac – singer
 Bobby Grubic – songwriter/composer, singer, music director and producer
 Stjepan Hauser – cellist
 Dino Jelusić – rock singer, musician, and songwriter
 Delo Jusic – composer
 Tereza Kesovija – singer
 Mišo Kovač
 Josipa Lisac – singer
 Lorde – singer-songwriter, real name Ella Marija Lani Yelich-O'Connor 
 Radoslav Lorković – folk and blues singer, pianist, accordionist
 Magazin – pop band
 Miljenko Matijevic – rock singer (Steelheart)
 Branko Mihaljević – composer, writer, journalist and radio editor
 Sandra Mihanovich – singer, musician, and composer
 Guy Mitchell – singer (born Albert George Cernik)
 Alan Merrill – vocalist, guitarist, songwriter, actor and model
 Helen Merrill (born Jelena Ana Milčetić) – jazz singer
 Tomo Milicevic – 30 Seconds to Mars
 Paul Mirkovich – musician, musical director
 Milan Mladenović – singer, guitar player
 Drago Mlinarec – rock singer-songwriter
 Boris Novković – pop singer
 Krist Novoselić – rock musician (Nirvana)
 Jurica Pađen – rock singer-songwriter
 Daniella Pavicic – singer-songwriter
 Marko Perković Thompson – rock singer
 Riva – band, 1989 Eurovision song contest winners
 Ivo Robić – singer
 Darko Rundek – singer and actor
 Saša, Tin i Kedžo – first Croatian boy band
 Krunoslav "Kićo" Slabinac – singer and composer of traditional folk songs
 Jura Stublić – rock singer
 Ivica Šerfezi – singer
 Luka Šulić – cellist
 Branimir Štulić (Djoni) – rock singer-songwriter
 The Bambi Molesters – rock band
 Elizabeth Anka Vajagic – singer/guitarist
 Johnny Vidacovich – drummer
 Siniša Vuco – singer
 Severina Vučković – pop singer
 Vice Vukov – singer
 Nikolija – singer

Literature 

 Ivo Andrić – novelist, poet and short story writer who won the Nobel Prize in Literature in 1961
 Ivan Aralica – writer
 Franjo Babić – writer, journalist
 Zvonimir Balog – poet, writer
 Juraj Baraković – poet
 Milan Begović – writer
 Sabo Bobaljević – poet
 Lukrecija Bogašinović Budmani – poet
 Ivana Brlić-Mažuranić – writer
 Mile Budak – writer
 Dobriša Cesarić – writer
 Milan Crnković – writer
 Džore Držić – poet, playwright
 Blanka Dovjak-Matković – poet, writer
 Slavenka Drakulić – writer, journalist
 Tomislav Dretar – writer, politician, journalist, critic
 Marin Držić – writer
 Ignjat Đurđević – poet, translator, historian, astronomer and Benedict monk
 Viktor Car Emin – writer from Istria
 Filip Erceg – writer and socialist politician
 Đuro Ferić – poet
 Drago Gervais – poet and playwright, paternal French descent
 Đivo Šiškov Gundulić – poet, dramatist and nobleman
 Ksaver Šandor Gjalski – writer
 Stanka Gjurić – poet and essayist
 Ivan Gundulić – Ragusan poet
 Petar Hektorović – writer
 Miljenko Jergović – writer
 Marija Jurić Zagorka – novelist
 Andrija Kačić Miošić – poet
 Janko Polić Kamov – avant-garde writer
 Brne Karnarutić – poet
 Radoslav Katičić – linguist, classical philologist, Indo-Europeanist, Slavist and Indologist
 Snježana Kordić – linguist
 Ante Kovačić – writer
 Ivan Goran Kovačić – poet
 Ron Kovic – Vietnam War veteran, writer and peace activist
 Josip Kozarac – writer
 Silvije Strahimir Kranjčević – poet
 Miroslav Krleža – novelist, writer, philosopher, encyclopedist
 Eugen Kumičić – writer
 Tomislav Ladan – writer
 Božena Loborec – poet, writer
 Hanibal Lucić – writer
 Darko Macan – writer
 Vjekoslav Majer – poet
 Igor Mandić – journalist
 Ranko Marinković – writer
 Marko Marulić – writer
 Antun Gustav Matoš – poet
 Ivan Mažuranić – poet
 Šiško Menčetić – poet
 Slavko Mihalić – poet, writer, journalist
 Zvonimir Milčec – writer, journalist
 Mijo Mirković – writer, economist
 Vjenceslav Novak – writer
 Josip Novakovich – writer
 Janus Pannonius (Ivan Česmički) – Hungarian poet of 15th century, of Croatian descent
 Vesna Parun – poet
 Vlatko Pavletić – theorist of literature, essayist and critic, politician
 Mikša Pelegrinović – poet
 Dalibor Perković – writer
 Sanja Pilić – writer
 Paula Preradović – poet
 Petar Preradović – poet
 Ivan Raos – writer, journalist
 Matija Antun Relković – writer
 Milan Rešetar – writer (ethnic Serb)
 Paul Salopek – journalist
 Paul Skalich – encyclopedist, Renaissance humanist and adventurer
 Antonio Skármeta – Chilean writer
 Ivan Slamnig – poet, novelist, literary theorist, translator
 Sonja Smolec – poet and writer
 Antun Sorkočević – writer, diplomat, composer
 Višnja Stahuljak – writer
 August Šenoa – writer
 Antun Branko Šimić – poet
 Dinko Šimunović – writer
 Sunčana Škrinjarić – writer, poet, journalist
 Slobodan Šnajder – writer
 Antun Šoljan – poet
 Drago Štambuk – poet
 Dragutin Tadijanović – poet
 Mihály Táncsics – writer, teacher, journalist and politician
 Ante Tomić – writer
 Josip Eugen Tomić – writer
 Jagoda Truhelka – writer, pedagogist
 Dubravka Ugrešić – writer
 Tin Ujević – poet
 Mavro Vetranović – writer, Benedictine friar
 Viktor Vida – writer
 Mirko Vidović – writer
 Jeronim Vidulić – Renaissance poet, priest
 Grigor Vitez – poet
 Pavao Ritter Vitezović – writer, historian, linguist and publisher
 Ivo Vojnović – writer
 Stanko Vraz – poet (ethnic Slovene)
 Sonja Yelich – poet
 Dinko Zlatarić – poet, translator, considered the best translator of the Renaissance
 Petar Zoranić – writer 
 Nikola Zrinski – poet, philosopher, soldier
 Aleksandar Žiljak – writer

Business 

 Madeline-Ann Aksich – businesswoman, philanthropist and artist
 Benedetto Cotrugli – merchant, economist, scientist, diplomat and humanist. Wrote the first description of double-entry bookkeeping.
 Mike Grgich – winemaker
 Victor Grinich – pioneer in the semiconductor industry
 Robert Herjavec – businessman, Herjavec Group, Dragons' Den and Shark Tank
 Antony Lucich-Lucas – engineer; crude oil exploration, Gulf Oil; Texaco
 Andrónico Luksic – Antofagasta PLC; richest Croat ever
 Michela Magas – designer, entrepreneur and innovation specialist
 Anthony Maglica – Maglite
 Branko Marinkovic – businessman
 Dietrich Mateschitz – Burgenland Croats; billionaire, owner of Red Bull corp.
 Nicolás Mihanovich – shipping magnate
 Boris Mikšić – Cortec Corporation
 Nikola Nobilo – wine maker
 Mario Puratić – inventor, businessman
 Bill Rancic – entrepreneur
 Al Ljutic – Ljutic Industries
 Mate Rimac – Rimac Automobili and Bugatti Rimac

Exploration 

 Ferdinand Konščak – explorer
 Dragutin Lerman – explorer
 Ignacije Szentmartony – explorer
 Željko Malnar – explorer, producer
 Mirko and Stjepan Seljan – explorers
 Ignacije Szentmartony – explorer
 Ivan Visin – explorer

Military 

 Edgar Angeli – Rear Admiral during World War II (ethnic Jewish)
 Matija Čanić – General during World War II
 Bernhard Caboga-Cerva – Feldzeugmeister of the Austrian Empire  
 Josip Kazimir Drašković – General in the Seven Years' War (1756–1763)
 Mato Dukovac – Croatian World War II fighter ace
 Mirosław Ferić – Polish fighter pilot of World War II, Bosnian Croat father
 Jure Francetić – Ustashe Commissioner
 Cvitan Galić – Croatian World War II fighter ace
 Ilija Gregorić – Military commander of rebels during the Croatian and Slovenian peasant revolt
 Matija Gubec – leader of the Croatian and Slovenian peasant revolt
 Luka Ibrišimović – Priest and Hajduk
 Đuro Jakčin – Naval Commander and first Commander of the Navy during World War II
 Nikola Jurišić – nobleman, soldier, and diplomat
 Ivan Karlović – ban of Croatia
 Petar Keglević – ban of Croatia and Slavonia
 Vinko Knežević – nobleman and General in the Habsburg Austria Army
 Vladimir Kren – Major General and Commander of the Air Force during World War II
 Petar Krešimir IV of Croatia – medieval king and military leader
 Petar Kružić – heroic defender of Klis against the Turks
 Grgo Kusić – tallest Croat ever, tallest soldier of Austro-Hungarian Army
 Slavko Kvaternik – Minister of Armed Forces during World War II
 Ivan Lenković – Army general and the leader of the Uskoks
 Mladen Lorković – Foreign Minister and Minister of Interior during World War II
 Marko Mesić – priest and war hero from the Ottoman Wars
 Vladimir Metikoš – General during World War II
 Vladimir Majder – Croatian partisan and Spanish Civil War veteran
 Miroslav Navratil – fighter pilot during WWI, General during WWII
 Michael J. Novosel – hero of the Vietnam War
 Rüstem Pasha Opuković – Grand Vizier of the Ottoman Empire
 Piyale Pasha – Ottoman Grand Admiral and Vizier
 Lothar Rendulic – Austrian Colonel General during World War II
 Mathias Rukavina von Boynograd – General in the Austro-Hungarian Army
 Stjepan Sarkotić – General in the Austro-Hungarian Army
 Arsen Sečujac – General in the Habsburg Austria Army
 Tomislav Sertić – General during World War II
 Ivan L. Slavich, Jr. – United States Army colonel, military pioneer, served in World War II, the Korean War, and the Vietnam War
 Andrijica Šimić – legendary hajduk
 Tom Starcevich – Australian recipient of the Victoria Cross during WWII
 Ivan Tomašević – soldier and World War II General
 Tomislav – first Croatian king
 Peter Tomich (Petar Tomić) – U.S. Army and U.S. Navy
 Mijat Tomić – Croatian legendary Hajduk
 Baron Franjo Trenk – leader of Pandurs; father of military music
 Franjo Vlašić – General and Ban
 Josef Philipp Vukassovich – Habsburg commander
 Matija Zmajević – Admiral of the Baltic fleet
 Petar Zrinski – Croatian ban and conspirator
 Nikola Šubić Zrinski – Croatian ban, hero of the Battle of Szigetvár
 Nikola VII Zrinski – Croatian ban, warrior and poet

Croatian War for Independence 

 Janko Bobetko – general
 Ante Gotovina – general pukovnik
 Josip Jović – Croatian policeman, first victim in Independence War
 Rudolf Perešin – fighter pilot
 Blago Zadro – general

Politics 

 Mehmed Alajbegović – Foreign Minister and Minister of Walfare during World War II
 Josip Broz Tito – ruler of Yugoslavia from 1945 to 1980
 Dražen Budiša – politician
 Ivana Dulić-Marković – Serbian politician of Croat ethnicity; vice-president of G17 Plus; former Deputy Prime Minister of Serbia and once Minister of Agriculture, Forestry and Water Management
 Josip Frank – Croatian patriot politician (ethnic Jewish)
 Andrija Hebrang – Croatian communist party leader, nationally conscious (ethnic Jewish)
 Većeslav Holjevac – a president of SR Croatia in Yugoslavia and a long-time mayor of its capital Zagreb
 Josip Jelačić – soldier, former Croatian ban
 Osman Kulenović – Deputy Prime Minister NDH
 Džafer-beg Kulenović – politician in NDH
 Vladko Maček – political centrist, leader of the Croatian Peasant Party before the establishment of the Independent State of Croatia
 Nikola Mandić – Prime Minister during World II
 Ante Marković – former Yugoslav prime minister
 Stipe Mesić – President of the Republic of Croatia
 Dr. Ante Pavelić (older) – vice-president of the National assembly of the State of Slovenes, Croats and Serbs
 Ante Pavelić – Ustaša leader
 Stjepan Radić – Croatian national leader in 1st half of 20th century
 Ante Starčević – "father of Croat nation"
 Milan Šufflay – historian, one of greatest albanologists
 Ante Trumbić – Croatian national leader
 Franjo Tuđman – first President of Croatia, founder of modern Croatia

Foreign figures of Croatian descent 

People of Croatian ancestry who are high-ranked officials of other countries:
 Mark Begich – US Senator from Alaska
 James Belich – former Mayor of Wellington, New Zealand
 Cesar Bielich-Pomareda – Minister of the Navy of Peru
 Michael Bilandic – former Mayor of Chicago; former Illinois State Supreme Court Chief Justice
 Gabriel Boric – President of Chile
 Natasha Stott Despoja – Australian Democrat Senator
 Ivan Gašparovič – President of Slovakia (Croatian father)
 Cedomil Lausic Glasinovic – Chilean MIR activist, executed 1975
 Alejandro Jadresic – Chilean Energy Minister, engineer, economist; awarded the Order of Prince Trpmir of the Republic of Croatia
 John Kasich – Governor of Ohio
 Dennis Kucinich – US Representative from Ohio; former Mayor of Cleveland
 Frank Mahovlich – Canadian Senator (NHL Hall of Famer)
 Mary Matalin – US political consultant
 Josip Marohnić – founding father of Croatian Fraternal Union
 John Newman – assassinated Australian politician, martyr
 Roy Nikisch – Governor of Chaco, Argentina
 Rudy Perpich – former Governor of Minnesota
 Baldo Prokurica – former Congressman, current Senator in Chile
 Edmundo Pérez Zujovic – Chilean PDC, Minister of Finance, Interior and of Public Works, assassinated in 1971
 Francisco Orlić Bolmarčić – former President of Costa Rica, Croat parents
 George Radanovich – US Representative from California
 Clem Simich – Member of NZ Parliament
 Jorge Sobisch – Governor of Neuquén, Argentina
 Leonor Oyarzún Ivanovic – former Chilean First Lady
 Néstor Carlos Kirchner Ostoić – former president of Argentina (Chilean mother of Croatian descent)
 Eric Skrmetta – US politician
 Vincent Thomas – US politician
 Michael Anthony Stepovich – former Governor of Alaska
 Radomiro Tomic – former Chilean Deputy, Senator and Ambassador
 Lynne Yelich – Member of Canadian Parliament

Religion 

 Ivan Ančić – theological writer
 Josip Bozanić – cardinal
 Markantun de Dominis – archbishop
 Matija Vlačić Ilirik – Protestant reformer
 Juraj Habdelić – Jesuit and writer
 Luka Ibrišimović – friar, leader of an uprising against Ottoman forces in Slavonia
 Estanislao Esteban Karlic – Archbishop of Paraná, Argentina
 Bartol Kašić – Jesuit and grammarian during the Counter-Reformation
 Baltazar Adam Krčelić – historian, theologian and lawyer
 Marko Krizin (Marko Križevčanin) – saint
 Antun Mahnić – bishop
 Leopold Mandić – saint
 Ivan Merz – beatified
 Gregory of Nin – bishop
 Franciscus Patricius – philosopher and scientist
 Marija Petković – beatified nun
 Ivo Protulipac – layman
 Vinko Puljić – Cardinal Priest of the Roman Catholic Church in Sarajevo
 John of Ragusa – Cardinal
 Franjo Šeper – Cardinal and Prefect of the Congregation for the Doctrine of the Faith
 Alojzije Stepinac – archbishop, beatified
 Zlatko Sudac – stigmatic
 Nikola Tavelić – saint
 Miroslav Volf – Christian theologian
 Bernard Zamanja – theologist

Heroism 
 
Paul Bucha
 Mila Gojsalić
 Nikola Jurišić
 Marko Križevčanin
 Michael J. Novosel
 Petar Perica
 Nikola Tavelić
 Mijat Tomić
 John J. Tominac
 Ivan Vranetić

Urban legends 
 Jure Grando – first real person described as a vampire in historical records
 Joe Magarac – American steel worker of Croatian extraction.
 Joe "Pegleg" Morgan – first non-Hispanic member of the Mexican Mafia
 Frane Selak – survivor of seven incidents of possible death, lottery winner
 Matija Babić – anti-hrvat i Vijetnamac

Sport 

 John Abramovic – former basketball player, played in the Basketball Association of America for Pittsburgh Ironmen, St. Louis Bombers, Baltimore Bullets and Syracuse Nationals
 Mirko Alilović – handball goalkeeper
 Mario Ančić – tennis; Davis Cup Champion
 Johnny Babich – former baseball player, played in Major League Baseball for Brooklyn Dodgers, Boston Bees, and Philadelphia Athletics
 Dalibor Bagarić – former NBA player
 Ivano Balić – handball player, IHF player of the year 2003, 2006
 Zvonko Bego – football player
 Željko Bilecki – football player
 Bill Belichick – NFL Coach
 Brian Billick – NFL coach
 Gary Beban – former NFL player
Dragan Bender (born 1997) – basketball player in the Israeli Basketball Premier League
 Pete Bercich – former NFL player
 Dražen Besek – football coach and former player
 Sandra Bezic – figure skater, choreographer and television commentator
 Val Bezic – figure skater
 Slaven Bilić – former football player, former manager of Croatian national football team and current manager of West Ham United in the Premier League
 Dražen Biškup – football coach and former player
 Djurdjica Bjedov – swimmer
 Zlatan Ibrahimović – football player
 Antonio Blasevich – football player and coach
 Goran Blažević – football goalkeeper
 Miroslav Blažević – football Manager
 Zvonimir Boban – football player
 Bojan Bogdanović – basketball player in NBA
 Andrew Bogut – NBA basketball player
 Alen Bokšić – football player
 Tamara Boroš – table tennis champion
 Mark Bosnich – football goalkeeper, Premier League
 Mark Bresciano – football player (Italian father, Croat mother)
 Reid Brignac – baseball player
 Denis Buntić – handball player
 Nick Burley – boxer
 Tony Butkovich – American football player, All-American
 Pete Carroll – NFL head coach and executive vice president
 Joseph Cattarinich – NHL Hall of Famer
 George Chuvalo – heavyweight boxer
 Branko Cikatić – First K-1 Grand Prix Winner (kickboxing)
 Marin Čilić – No. 1 Junior in the World (tennis) and US Open champion
 Ann Cindric – baseball player
 Vedran Ćorluka – football player, Tottenham Hotspur
 Krešimir Ćosić – member of the basketball Hall of Famer
 Fred Couples – golfer (former World number 1)
 Helen Crlenkovich – athlete
 Dario Cvitanich – football player, Ajax
 Ivona Dadic – Austrian track and field athlete
 Nick Dasovic – football player and coach
 Paul Diamond – professional wrestler, soccer player
 David Diehl – NFL player
 Nicholas Drazenovic – ice hockey player
 Stipe Drews – boxing champion
 Domagoj Duvnjak – handball player
 Marina Erakovic – tennis player, New Zealand
 Abby Erceg – football player, New Zealand
 Eddie Erdelatz – American football player
 Elvis Fatović – former water polo player and coach, European and World medalist
 Mirko Filipović (Cro Cop) – mixed martial artist and kickboxer; K-1
 Jonathan Filewich – ice hockey player
 Mark Fistric – ice hockey player
 Dražen Funtak – sprint canoer
 Gary Gabelich – American automobile-racing driver
 Ray Gabelich – Australian Rules footballer
 Gabre Gabric – track and field athlete
 Gino Gardassanich – football player
 Gordan Giriček – former NBA player
 Mike Golic – co-host of ESPN Radio's Mike and Mike in the Morning; former NFL player
 Kara Goucher – long-distance runner
 Elvis Grbac – NFL player
 Great Antonio – strongman
 Visco Grgich – former NFL player
 Bobby Grich – former MLB player
 Tom Haller – MLB baseball player
 Justin Hamilton – basketball player
 Travis Hamonic – ice hockey player
 John Havlicek – basketball player
 John Hecimovic – ice hockey player
 Frankie Hejduk – football player, MLS
 Mario Hezonja – basketball player, NBA
 Zvonimir Boban – football player
 Robert Jarni – football player
 Saša Hiršzon (born 1972) – tennis player
 Ico Hitrec – football player
 Hrvoje Horvat – handball player
 Les Horvath – former NFL player
 Tony Hrkac – ice hockey player
 Dick Hrstich – New Zealand wrestler
 Goran Ivanišević – tennis player; Wimbledon Champion; two Olympic bronze medals, 1992
 Andreas Ivanschitz – football player
 Robert Jarni – football player
 Nikica Jelavić – football player, Everton FC
 Ana Jelušić – skier
 Dražan Jerković – football player (top scorer WC 1962 and EURO 1960)
 Ed Jurak – baseball player
 Al Jurisich – baseball player
 Igor Jurković – kickboxer
 John Jurkovic – NFL player
 Tvrtko Kale – football player, goalkeeper (Hapoel Haifa)
 Ivo Karlović – tennis player
 Mario Kasun – former NBA player, Orlando Magic
Siniša Kelečević (born 1970) – basketball player
 Ivan Klasnić – football player, Werder Bremen
 Marko Kopljar – handball player
 Ante Kostelić – Alpine skiing coach
 Ivica Kostelić – Alpine Skiing Slalom World Cup Champion (three Olympic silvers)
 Janica Kostelić – A.S. World Cup Champion in 2001, 2003 & 2006 (four Olympic golds, two silvers)
 Dan Kordic – ice hockey player
 John Kordic – ice hockey player
 Robert Kovač – football player
 Niko Kovač – football player
 Mario Kovačević – football player
 Niko Kranjčar – football player
 Mike Kreevich – baseball player
 Toni Kukoč – NBA player (NBA Sixth Man of the Year 1995–96)
 Blaženko Lacković – handball player
 Dražen Ladić – football goalkeeper
 Stefan Leko – kickboxer
 Curt Leskanic – former MLB pitcher
 Matija Ljubek – kayaker
 Ivan Ljubičić – tennis player; Davis Cup Champion (#3)
 Johnny Logan – baseball player
 Mickey Lolich – baseball player
 Venio Losert – handball goalkeeper
 Steve Lubratich – baseball player
 Dan Luger – rugby union player
 Frank Mahovlich – NHL Hall of Famer (1958 Calder Trophy winner)
 Pete Mahovlich – NHL player
 Iva Majoli – Roland Garros Champion
 Tony Mandarich – American football player
 John Mandic – NBA player
 Mario Mandžukić – football player, plays for Juventus
 Todd Marinovich – former NFL player
 Marv Marinovich – former NFL player
 Vic Markov – American football player
 Roger Maris – baseball player, MLB
 Željko Mavrović – former European boxing champion
 John Mayasich – former hockey player
 Catfish Metkovich – baseball player
 Petar Metličić – handball player
 Siniša Mihajlović – (mother's side family) football player
 Marcello Mihalich – football player
 George Mikan (Mr. Basketball) – NBA (Basketball Hall of Fame)
 Pat Miletich – UFC mixed martial artist
 Stipe Miocic – UFC mixed martial artist
 Luka Modrić – football player, plays for Real Madrid C.F.
 Sofía Mulánovich – surfer
 Dražen Mužinić – football player
 Zdravko Miljak – handball player
 Rob Ninkovich – American football player
 Frank Nobilo – NZ golfer
 Mirjana Ognjenović – former Yugoslav/Croatian handball player
 Phil Oreskovic – ice hockey player
 Victor Oreskovich – ice hockey player
 Erv Palica – former MLB pitcher
 Mate Parlov – boxing champion
 Mark Pavelich – ice hockey, NHL
 Marty Pavelich – ice hockey, NHL
 Matt Pavelich – ice hockey, NHL official
 Snježana Pejčić – shooting player
 Sandra Perković – discus thrower
 Nikolaj Pešalov – Olympic gold medal winner in weightlifting
 Johnny Pesky – baseball player, manager and coach
 Dražen Petrović – NBA Hall of Famer
 Zoran Planinić – former NBA player
 Dan Plesac – former MLB pitcher
 Diana Prazak – professional boxer
 Robert Prosinečki – football player
 Joel Prpic – ice hockey player
 Dado Pršo – football player
 Braslav Rabar – chess player
 Dino Rađa – former NBA star
 Paul Radisich – racing driver
 Nikola Radulović – basketball player
 Ivan Rakitić – footballer, plays for FC Barcelona
 Ante Razov – football player
 Jules Rykovich – former NFL player
 Borna Rendulić – NHL player
 Lou Saban – NFL coach
 Nick Saban – college football coach
 Spider Sabich – alpine skier
 Vladimir Sabich – American skier murdered by girlfriend Claudine Longet
 Brian Sakic – NHL player
 Joe Sakic – NHL player (2001 Hart Memorial Trophy Winner)
 Dario Šarić (Super Dario) – NBA player with the Philadelphia 76ers
 Cory Sarich – ice hockey player
 Buzz Schneider – ice hockey player
 Branko Šegota – football player
 Frank Sinkwich – American football player and awarded the Heisman Trophy
 Elvis Sinosic (King of Rock N Rumble) – mixed martial artist, UFC
 Paul Skansi – American football player
 Nick Skorich – American football player and coach
 Matt Skrmetta – baseball player
 Paul Spoljaric – baseball player
 Josef Spudich – American football player
 Darijo Srna – football player
 Max Starcevich – All-American football guard
 Steve Stipanovich – former NBA player, No.2 pick in 1983 NBA Draft
 Dominik Straga – swimmer
 Dario Šimić – football player
 Davor Šuker – football player (best scorer of the 1998 WC most goals winner of golden shoe in 98 WC with six goals)
 Bruno Šundov – former NBA player
 Žan Tabak – former NBA player
 Marko Tomas – basketball player
 Rudy Tomjanovich – former NBA player and coach
 Andy Tonkovich – first NBA pick in 1948
 Igor Tudor – football player
 The Great Antonio – strongman and eccentric
 Roko Ukić – NBA player
 Auggie Vidovich – NASCAR driver
 Mark Viduka – football player, Premier League
 Blanka Vlašić – high jumper
 Marc-Édouard Vlasic – ice hockey player
 Antonio Vojak – football player
 Oliviero Vojak – football player
 Nikolai Volkoff – WWE Hall of Famer, born Josip Peruzović
 Danny Vranes – basketball player
 Stojko Vranković – former NBA player
 Nikola Vujčić (born 1978) – basketball player and team manager of Maccabi Tel Aviv
 Bernard Vukas – football player
 Vladimir Vuković – chess player
 Božo Vuletić – Olympic water polo gold medalist
 Wesna – professional wrestler
 Slaven Zambata – football player
 Fritzie Zivic (The Croat Comet) – former World Welterweight Champion
 Chris Zorich – former NFL player
 Zdravko Zovko – handball player
 Bob Zupcic – baseball player
 Ante Žižić (born 1997) – basketball player in the Israeli Basketball Premier League
 Mario Andretti – racing driver, born in Motovun

See also 

 List of Croatian artists
 List of Istrians
 Croats
 Croatian diaspora
 Croatian American
 Croats in Argentina
 Croatians in Austria
 Croatian Australian
 Croats of Belgium
 Croats of Bosnia and Herzegovina
 Croatian Brazilian
 Croatian Canadian
 Croatian Chilean
 Croats in the Czech Republic
 Croatians in Germany
 Croats in Hungary
 Croats of Italy
 Croatia–Mexico relations
 Croats of Montenegro
 Croats in New Zealand
 Croatian Peruvian
 Croats of Romania
 Croats of Serbia
 Croats in Slovakia
 Croats of Slovenia
 Croats of Sweden
 Croats of Switzerland
 Croats in Uruguay
 List of Croatian sportspeople
 Croatian literature (includes a list of Croats in literature)
 List of rulers of Croatia

References

External links
 Additional list of Croatian architects and builders: :hr:Dodatak:Popis hrvatskih arhitekata i graditelja
 Additional list of Croatian sculptors: :hr:Kategorija:Hrvatski kipari
 Additional list of Croatian painters: :Category:Croatian painters :hr:Kategorija:Hrvatski slikari
 Additional list of Croatian stage actors: :hr:Kategorija:Hrvatski kazališni glumci
 Outstanding Croats
 Croats and Croatia In French